Never a Dull Moment is a 1950 American comedy western film from RKO Pictures, starring Irene Dunne and Fred MacMurray. The film is based on the 1943 book Who Could Ask For Anything More? by Kay Swift. The filming took place between December 5, 1949, and February 1, 1950, in Thousand Oaks, California. It has no relation to the 1968 Disney film of the same name starring Dick Van Dyke and Edward G. Robinson.

Plot
At a rodeo in New York, visiting cowboy Chris Heyward is charmed to make the acquaintance of Kay Kingsley, a songwriter. They marry and move out west to his ranch in Wyoming. Here, she meets Chris' two daughters from a previous marriage, Nan and Tina, and his old  romantic interest, Jean Morrow.

Kay tries to adjust to her new life in Wyoming, but it is hard: a windstorm threatens their home, and the children are leery of her. A rival rancher named Mears holds the water rights to his land; Kay accidentally humiliates him at a dance and kills his prize steer.

Kay is eventually offered a job back in New York that could help pay for the water rights. She takes it, but Chris is alienated; he needs to be persuaded by the kids to return east and win her back.

Cast
 Irene Dunne as Kay
 Fred MacMurray as Chris
 William Demarest as Mears
 Andy Devine as Orvie
 Gigi Perreau as Tina
 Natalie Wood as Nan
 Philip Ober as Jed
 Jack Kirkwood as Papa Dude
 Ann Doran as Jean

Uncredited (in order of appearance)
 Jacqueline deWit as Myra Van Elson, Kay's sarcastic friend
 Lela Bliss	as Mama Dude
 Irving Bacon as Tunk Johnson
 Gene Evans	as Hunter
 Olin Howland as Hunter
 Paul Newlan as Hunter
 Chester Conklin as Albert
 Jimmy Hawkins as Chalmers
 Mason Alan Dinehart as Sonny Boy
 Dan White as Shivaree participant
 Victoria Horne as Shivaree participant

Songs by Kay Swift
 "Once You Find Your Guy" (sung by Dunne in the film's opening minutes)
 "The Man with the Big Felt Hat"
 "Sagebrush Lullaby"

Reception
The New York Times critic Bosley Crowther described the film as a "miserably tedious farce" whose "sole achievement as entertainment is the presentation of Irene Dunne in a series of rustic encounters that are about as funny as stepping on a nail."

References

External links
 
 
 
 

1950 films
1950 romantic comedy films
American black-and-white films
American romantic comedy films
1950s Western (genre) comedy films
Films based on American novels
Films directed by George Marshall
Films scored by Friedrich Hollaender
Films set in New York City
Films set in Wyoming
RKO Pictures films
Films shot in Ventura County, California
1950s English-language films
1950s American films